Shem Tatupu (born 18 February 1968) is a former rugby league and rugby union footballer. He made his début for Samoa in 1990, and represented the country in the 1995 Rugby Union World Cup. He switched to rugby league to sign for Wigan, playing for the club in the inaugural Super League season before returning to rugby union and signing for Northampton Saints.

References

External links
 Profile at Rugby League Project
 Profile at Statbunker
 Profile at wigan.rlfans.com
Shem J. Tatupu at New Zealand Rugby History

1968 births
Living people
New Zealand rugby league players
New Zealand rugby union players
Wigan Warriors players
Northampton Saints players
Samoa international rugby union players
People from Auckland
Rugby league props